Lutrochus luteus is a species of travertine beetle in the family Lutrochidae. It is found in North America.

References

Further reading

 

Byrrhoidea
Articles created by Qbugbot
Beetles described in 1852